Nothing Personal is a 1995 Irish-British drama film; it was directed by Thaddeus O'Sullivan with screenwriter Daniel Mornin.

Ian Hart won the Volpi Cup for best supporting actor at the 52nd Venice International Film Festival.

Plot 
In 1975 Belfast, the Troubles are in full effect. A Protestant bar is bombed by Catholics and several people are killed. Hours later, Protestant fighters Kenny and Ginger retaliate by killing a Catholic, starting a full-scale riot. Meanwhile, Liam, a Catholic single father, attempts to help the victims of the fighting, but finds himself on the wrong side of the Protestant-Catholic divide.

Cast
 Ian Hart as Ginger
 John Lynch as Liam
 James Frain as Kenny
 Michael Gambon as Leonard
 Rúaidhrí Conroy as Tommy
 Maria Doyle Kennedy as Ann 
 Gerard McSorley as Cecil
 Ciarán Fitzgerald as Young Liam Kelly

References

External links
 
 
 

1995 films
Irish drama films
1995 drama films
Northern Irish films
British drama films
Films directed by Thaddeus O'Sullivan
1990s British films
Troubles
The Troubles (Northern Ireland)
Works about The Troubles (Northern Ireland)

Films set in Belfast